An abortion referendum took place in Portugal on 11 February 2007, to decide whether to legalise abortion up to ten weeks. The referendum was the fulfillment of an election pledge by the governing Socialist Party of Prime Minister José Sócrates.

Official results of the referendum showed that 59.24% of the Portuguese approved the proposal put on ballot, while 40.76% rejected it. However, only 43.61% of the registered voters turned out to vote. Since voter turnout was below 50%, according to the Portuguese Constitution, these results are not legally binding, and parliament can legally decide to disregard them. Prime Minister Sócrates nevertheless confirmed that he would expand the circumstances under which abortion was allowed, since a majority of voters had been in favour.

The law was ratified by President Aníbal Cavaco Silva on 10 April 2007.

Question
The question in the referendum was:

Under the current law, abortions are allowed up 12 weeks if the mother's life or mental or physical health is at risk, up to 16 weeks in cases of rape and up to 24 weeks if the child may be born with an incurable disease or deformity. The new law, approved on 9 March 2007, allows abortions on request up to the tenth week.

Political positions
The major parties in Portugal listed with their political positioning and their official answer to the referendum question:

 Left
 Portuguese Communist Party – YES
 Left Bloc – YES
 Ecologist Party "The Greens" – YES
 Socialist Party – YES
 Right
 Social Democratic Party – NEUTRAL (the party was divided, however, important members, including the then leader, Luís Marques Mendes, said NO)
 People's Party – NO

Opinion polling
A December 2006 Aximage/Correio da Manhã poll had found that 61% of Portugal's electorate supported the proposal, 26% did not, and 12% were "not sure". An earlier survey from October 2006 had yielded similar results. However, a poll from mid-January 2007 had seen support drop to 38 to 28 in favour.

Results

Results by district

History
In 1998 the same question had been put in another referendum. In this case a small majority voted no and the law was not implemented.

See also

Abortion law

References

External links
Results of the referendum

2007 referendums
Abortion referendum
Abortion in Portugal
Referendums in Portugal
February 2007 events in Europe
Abortion referendums